Jean Philippe Gargantiel (born 1930) is a French singer who represented France at the Eurovision Song Contest 1959. He returned to the contest in 1962 representing Switzerland. He was the first artist to compete for two countries at Eurovision.

Eurovision Song Contest
The Eurovision Song Contest 1959 was held at the Palais des Festivals et des Congrès in Cannes, France, after the victory of André Claveau the previous year, in Hilversum, the Netherlands. Jean Philippe sang "Oui, oui, oui, oui" (Yes, yes, yes, yes) and came third, receiving 15 points.

He returned to the contest in 1962 at the Villa Louvigny in Luxembourg and represented Switzerland with the appropriately titled "Le retour" (The return). He was less successful second time around, garnering only two points and placing equal tenth.

Films
Jean Philippe appeared in the 1960 film Jazz Boat in which he sang "Oui, oui, oui, oui".

References

External links

1931 births
Possibly living people
Eurovision Song Contest entrants for France
Eurovision Song Contest entrants of 1959
Eurovision Song Contest entrants for Switzerland
Eurovision Song Contest entrants of 1962
20th-century French male singers